Falculelle (singular: falculella) are a typical dessert of the Corsican cuisine. 

Originally from Corte, they are small cakes prepared essentially mixing brocciu, egg yolk, flour, sugar and orange zest. This mixture is then baked on a chestnut leaf.

Notes

Sources

Corsican desserts
Italian cakes